Confidence is an unincorporated community in Putnam County West Virginia, United States,  located on WV 34. The community is served by Confidence Elementary School. Confidence is a part of the Huntington-Ashland Metropolitan Statistical Area (MSA). As of the 2010 census, the MSA had a population of 287,702. New definitions from February 28, 2013 placed the population at 363,000.

References 

Unincorporated communities in Putnam County, West Virginia
Unincorporated communities in West Virginia
Charleston, West Virginia metropolitan area